Baluhawa is a village development committee in the Kapilvastu District, of the Lumbini Zone, in Nepal. At the time of the 1991 Nepal census, it had a population of 3774 people that were living in 600 individual households.

References

Populated places in Kapilvastu District
Archaeological sites in Nepal